Samuel Abrahám (born 1960 in Bratislava) is rector of BISLA, a small liberal arts college in Bratislava, Slovakia. Samuel Abrahám studied political science and political philosophy at the University of Toronto and at Carleton University in Ottawa, Ontario, Canada.

Education Innovator 
Samuel Abrahám is currently involved in ECOLAS - a network of universities supported by European funding in order to spread and support liberal arts education in Europe.

Membership of organizations 
From 1996 to 2004 he was representative of the Project on Ethnic Relations, a Princeton-based foundation focusing on resolving ethnic tensions in Central and Eastern Europe.
He is also a member of the advisory board of Eurozine - an internet journal of a network of European cultural journals.

Academic posts 
From 1990 onwards he helped to establish and lectured at Political science department at Comenius University.
In 1996 he founded and has since edited Slovak-English cultural journal Kritika & Kontext. 
During 1996 - 2006 he founded and directed Society for Higher Learning, an educational institution for gifted university students. In 2006 he co-founded and has been the rector of Bratislava International School of Liberal Arts (BISLA).

References

1960 births
Living people
Rectors of universities in Slovakia
Writers from Bratislava